Scot Eugene Brantley (born February 24, 1958) is an American radio and television sports broadcaster and former college and professional football player who was a linebacker in the National Football League (NFL) for eight seasons during the 1980s.  Brantley played college football for the University of Florida, and thereafter, he played professionally for the Tampa Bay Buccaneers of the NFL.

Early years

Brantley was born in Chester, South Carolina in 1958.  He attended Forest High School in Ocala, Florida, where he played high school football for the Forest Wildcats.  Brantley was a starting linebacker on the Wildcats varsity as a freshman, and as a junior and senior, he was a member of the Wildcats' 1974 and 1975 Florida Class 3A high school state championship teams.  Brantley was twice named a high school All-American by Parade magazine, and was one of the mostly highly sought-after college recruits in the country in 1975.  He was also a standout outfielder for the Wildcats baseball team, and was drafted by the New York Mets despite having already signed with the Florida Gators to play college football.

In 2007, thirty-one years after he graduated from high school, the Florida High School Athletic Association (FHSAA) recognized Brantley as one of the "100 Greatest Players of the First 100 Years" of Florida high school football.

College career

Brantley accepted an athletic scholarship to attend the University of Florida in Gainesville, Florida, where he played for coach Doug Dickey and coach Charley Pell's Florida Gators football teams from 1976 to 1979.  Brantley was a first-team All-Southeastern Conference (SEC) selection in 1977 and 1978 and received honorable mention All-American honors in 1977 and 1978.  His senior season in 1979 was cut short by a brain injury after he was knocked unconscious in the Gators' first home game, which was a severe blow to a team in the first year of a coaching transition.  Brantley led the Gators in tackles during the 1976 and 1978 seasons, and his career total of 467 tackles still ranks second on the Gators' all-time records list.

Brantley was inducted into the University of Florida Athletic Hall of Fame as a "Gator Great" in 1990, and the Florida-Georgia Hall of Fame in 2010.  In a 2006 article series, the sports editors of The Gainesville Sun recognized him as No. 25 among the top 100 Gators from the first 100 Florida football seasons.

Professional career

Life after the NFL

Following his professional football career, Brantley pursued a career in sports broadcasting.  He has served on the Gator Radio Network as both a color analyst during games and an analyst during pre-game, half-time and post-game shows.  Brantley also spent ten seasons as the broadcast partner of Gene Deckerhoff on the Buccaneers Radio Network.  He now hosts a daily radio show on WHBO in Tampa, Florida every weekday afternoon.

Brantley's broadcasting career has had ups and downs.  The Gators and Buccaneers both unexpectedly dropped him from their broadcast booths after the 2004 and 2005 seasons, respectively, after he had spent seven years in each of those positions.  Hardy Nickerson replaced him for the Buccaneers broadcasts, while Lee McGriff took his spot when he returned to the Gators broadcasts after spending several years alongside Mick Hubert in the 1980s and 1990s.  Brantley's previous radio show on WQYK was also canceled due to format changes with the station.

Brantley suffered two small strokes in 2008, and lost most of his sight in his left eye as a result.  He was forced to take a leave of absence from his radio broadcasting responsibilities while recovering from the strokes and subsequent heart surgery.

In 2013, Brantley began co-hosting an afternoon drive-time show, "Sports Time!", heard on WMOP & WGGG weekdays from 4-6 p.m. His co-hosts are Steve Woodard and Mark McLeod. The stations are owned/operated by Florida Sports Talk and carry NBC Sports Radio.

In May 2018 it was revealed that Scot was suffering from Alzheimer's disease.
He was featured on an episode of Real Sports on HBO titled "Unsettled" concerning disabled NFL players unable to receive payments from the NFL concussion settlement.

Gator football family

Brantley's nephew, John Brantley, IV, was the Florida Gators' starting quarterback for the 2010 and 2011 seasons.  His brother, John Brantley, III, was the Gators' starting quarterback in 1978.

See also

 Florida Gators football, 1970–79
 History of the Tampa Bay Buccaneers
 List of Florida Gators in the NFL Draft
 List of University of Florida Athletic Hall of Fame members

References

Bibliography

 Carlson, Norm, University of Florida Football Vault: The History of the Florida Gators, Whitman Publishing, LLC, Atlanta, Georgia (2007).  .
 Golenbock, Peter, Go Gators!  An Oral History of Florida's Pursuit of Gridiron Glory, Legends Publishing, LLC, St. Petersburg, Florida (2002).  .
 Hairston, Jack, Tales from the Gator Swamp: A Collection of the Greatest Gator Stories Ever Told, Sports Publishing, LLC, Champaign, Illinois (2002).  .
 McCarthy, Kevin M.,  Fightin' Gators: A History of University of Florida Football, Arcadia Publishing, Mount Pleasant, South Carolina (2000).  .
 Nash, Noel, ed., The Gainesville Sun Presents The Greatest Moments in Florida Gators Football, Sports Publishing, Inc., Champaign, Illinois (1998).  .

1958 births
Living people
People from Chester, South Carolina
Sportspeople from Ocala, Florida
Players of American football from South Carolina
American football linebackers
Ocala High School alumni
Florida Gators football players
Tampa Bay Buccaneers players
Baseball players from South Carolina
Florida Gators baseball players
American sports radio personalities
National Football League announcers
Tampa Bay Buccaneers announcers